Dorjan Bajrami (born 2 March 1996) is a retired Albanian  professional football player. He spent the majority of his career at his hometown club Turbina, as well as playing for Gramshi, Luzi and Bylis. He announced his retirement from football at the age of 25 on 16 June 2021.

References

1996 births
Living people
People from Cërrik
Albanian footballers
Association football defenders
Kategoria e Dytë players
Kategoria e Parë players
Kategoria Superiore players
KF Turbina players
KF Gramshi players
KF Luz i Vogël 2008 players
KF Bylis Ballsh players